Luther O'Neal (May 15, 1889 – death unknown) was an American Negro league catcher in the 1910s. 

A native of Lincoln County, Tennessee, O'Neal made his Negro leagues debut in 1910 with the West Baden Sprudels. He played five seasons with the Sprudels, and also played for the Louisville White Sox and Indianapolis ABCs in 1914.

References

External links
  and Seamheads

1889 births
Place of death missing
Year of death missing
Indianapolis ABCs players
Louisville White Sox (1914-1915) players
West Baden Sprudels players
Baseball catchers